Decídete is the third album released by Mexican singer Luis Miguel Gallego Basteri. It was released in 1983. There are two versions of this song. The original version was deemed too explicit as it contained suggestive lyrics referring to a teenage couple's first sexual encounter, so it was replaced with more tender lyrics about teenage romance.

Track listing

Charts

References 

1983 albums
Luis Miguel albums
EMI Records albums
Spanish-language albums